Johannesen is a surname. Notable people with the surname include:

Aksel V. Johannesen (born 1972), Faroese lawyer and politician
Eric Johannesen (born 1988), German rower
Frank Johannesen (born 1959), Norwegian sprint canoeist
Georg Johannesen (1931–2005), Norwegian writer
Glenn Johannesen (born 1962), Canadian ice hockey player
Grant Johannesen (1921–2005), American classical pianist
Johan Johannesen (1898–1979), Norwegian long jumper
Kaj Leo Johannesen (born 1964), Faroese footballer and Prime Minister of the Faroe Islands
Kim Johannesen (handballer) (born 1979), Danish handball player
Kim Johannesen (musician) (born 1985), Norwegian jazz musician
Knut Johannesen (born 1933), Norwegian speed skater
Olav Tuelo Johannesen (born 1984), Norwegian footballer
Óli Johannesen (born 1972), Norwegian footballer

See also
Johannesen Point, a headland of South Georgia
Johannessen
Johanneson

Patronymic surnames
Surnames from given names